Act! (previously known as Sage ACT! 2010–2013) is a customer relationship management (CRM) software and marketing automation software platform designed for, and used by, small and mid-sized businesses. It has a user base of over 800 thousand registered users.

History 
The company Conductor Software was founded 1986 in Dallas, Texas, by Pat Sullivan and Mike Muhney. The original name for the software was Activity Control Technology, then Automated Contact Tracking, before finally just using the acronym. The name of the company was subsequently changed to Contact Software International and was sold in 1993 to Symantec Corporation, who in 1999 then sold it to SalesLogix (later renamed Interact Commerce). The Sage Group purchased Interact Commerce in 2001 through Best Software, then its North American software division. Swiftpage acquired it in 2013.

Beginning with the 2006 version, the name was styled ACT! by Sage, and in 2010 revised to Sage ACT!.

Following its 2013 acquisition by Swiftpage, it was it was renamed to Act!. Swiftpage.

In May 2018, Act! was sold to SFW Advisors.

In December 2018, Kuvana, a marketing automation software solution, was acquired by SFW and merged with Act! This add-on is now a complementary service to the core CRM solution.

In December 2019, Act! hired Steve Oriola as President and CEO.

In 2020, Swiftpage changed its company name to Act! LLC.

Software 
Act! features include contact, company and opportunity management, a calendar, marketing automation and e-marketing tools, reports, interactive dashboards with graphical visualizations, and the ability to track prospective customers.

Act! integrates with Microsoft Word, Excel, Outlook, Google Contacts, Gmail, and other applications via Zapier. For custom integrations, Act! has an in-built API.

Act! can be accessed from Windows desktops (Win7 and later) with local or network shared database; synchronized to laptops or remote officers; Citrix or Remote Desktop; Web browsers (Premium only) with self or SaaS hosting; smartphones and tablets via HTML5 Web (Premium only); smartphones and tablets via sync with Handheld Contact.

See also 

 Lists of software
 Sales force management system
 CRM software

References

External links 

 

1987 software
Administrative software
Business software for Windows
Cloud applications
Customer relationship management software
Mobile applications
Mobile web
Productivity software
Products introduced in 1987
Proprietary software
Windows database-related software